Coco is a 2017 American computer-animated fantasy film produced by Pixar Animation Studios and released by Walt Disney Pictures. The film was directed by Lee Unkrich and was based on an original idea by Unkrich with the screenplay written by Adrian Molina (who also co-directed) and Matthew Aldrich. The film follows Miguel (voiced by Anthony Gonzalez), a 12-year-old boy, who is accidentally transported to the land of the dead. There he seeks the help of his deceased musician great-great-grandfather to return him to his family among the living. The film's voice cast also stars Gael García Bernal, Benjamin Bratt, Alanna Ubach, Renée Victor, Ana Ofelia Murguía, and Edward James Olmos.

The film premiered at the Morelia International Film Festival on October 20, 2017. It was theatrically released in Mexico the following week, before being released in over 3,900 theatres in the United States and Canada on November 27. , Coco has grossed $807.1 million at the worldwide box office. Rotten Tomatoes, a review aggregator, surveyed 276 reviews and judged 97% of them to be positive. Metacritic calculated a weighted average score of 81 out of 100 based on 48 reviews, indicating "universal acclaim".

Coco garnered a variety of awards and nominations, many of them in the Best Animated Feature and Best Original Song (for "Remember Me") categories. It was chosen by the National Board of Review as the Best Animated Film of 2017. At the 90th Academy Awards, it won Best Animated Feature and Best Original Song. The film garnered two nominations at the 75th Golden Globe Awards, winning for Best Animated Feature Film. Coco also won the BAFTA Award for Best Animated Film and the Critics' Choice Movie Award for both Best Animated Feature and Best Song. The film led the 45th Annie Awards with thirteen nominations, and won a record-breaking eleven awards, including Best Animated Feature, Outstanding Achievement for Directing in an Animated Feature Production, Outstanding Achievement for Writing in an Animated Feature Production, and Outstanding Achievement for Voice Acting in an Animated Feature Production for Gonzalez. Producer Darla K. Anderson won Outstanding Producer of Animated Theatrical Motion Pictures at the 29th Producers Guild of America Awards. The film won two Saturn Awards for Best Animated Film and Best Music. The film also received nominations for Best Score Soundtrack for Visual Media and Best Song Written for Visual Media at the 61st Annual Grammy Awards. The film's visual effects were acclaimed by the Visual Effects Society, which gave the film awards in all four of its animated film categories.

Accolades

Notes

References

External links
 

Lists of accolades by film
Pixar awards and nominations